Zieria smithii, commonly known as sandfly zieria, lanoline bush or Smithian zieria, is a plant in the citrus family Rutaceae and is endemic to eastern and south-eastern Australia. It is a robust shrub with its leaves composed of three leaflets, and groups of flowers with four white petals, the groups usually shorter than the leaves. It is common and widespread along the coast and adjacent ranges.

Description
The upper surface of the leaflets is a darker green than the lower side, dotted with oil glands and mostly glabrous.

The flowers are usually white and are arranged in groups of up to 60 in upper leaf axils, the groups shorter than the leaves and each flower  in diameter. In common with other zierias, there are only four stamens. Flowering occurs in autumn and spring and is followed by the fruit which is a capsule with three or four sections each containing one or two reddish brown to black striped seeds.

Taxonomy and naming
Zieria smithii was first formally described in 1810 by George Jackson and the description was published in The Botanist's Repository for New, and Rare Plants. The specific epithet (smithii) honours James Edward Smith who established the genus Zieria.

Distribution and habitat
This zieria occurs in Queensland as far north as the Atherton Tableland, south through the Brigalow Belt, Scenic Rim and Northern Tablelands. It is widespread and common on the coast and ranges of New South Wales but less common in Victoria. It grows in a wide range of habitats but is most common on the edge of rainforest, often in rocky areas.

References

smithii
Flora of New South Wales
Flora of Queensland
Flora of Victoria (Australia)
Sapindales of Australia
Plants described in 1810